Romsey Extra is a civil parish in the Borough of Test Valley and the English county of Hampshire.  At the 2011 census, it had a population of 3,276, although due to the ongoing 800 home Abbotswood development that begun after the census was taken, it is likely to have risen significantly by the next Census and by 50% between 2012 and 2018. This could be increased further by the possibility of a new 1300 home development at Whitenap.

The parish surrounds the town of Romsey and includes the villages of Abbotswood, Ashfield, Lee, Crampmoor and Shootash as well as the Broadlands estate

References

Test Valley
Civil parishes in Hampshire